The Castle River is a river in the Marlborough Region of New Zealand. Rising just north of Shingle Peak, the river flows east then south until it meets the Awatere River.

References

Rivers of the Marlborough Region
Rivers of New Zealand